Lee Mankyo (born in 1967; Hangul: 이만교) is a South Korean writer, whose works have been turned into Korean films.

Work
Lee Mankyo's work features verbal energy which brings to mind a garrulous exchange between gossipers. The various happenings in the lives of ordinary urbanites, which constitute Lee's fiction, are often of serious nature entailing many social implications, yet their style of being told is invariably lighthearted and jovial. In Marriage Is an Act of Madness, Lee's most well-known novel which was made into a movie by the same title, a series of amusing and frank conversations between two lovers strip away the layers of hypocrisy and falsehood surrounding marriage, sex and love in modern age. Another full-length novel, Will You Come To Meokko's House To Play? paints an entertaining as well as insightful picture of a family dynamics during the IMF crisis of 1997. The childlike frankness of the narrator allows candid view of the gravity of the situation and also enables moments of laughter as well as pathos in the novel.

Lee has stated that for him “any object, person or situation characterized by authority, exclusivity or piety excites a desire to make light of them--to make them laugh, or make them an object of laughter.” Ultimately, what Lee critiques through his parody is not the conventions of society but the hypocrisy surrounding them. In Lee's view, the natural beauty inherent in family life and the institution of marriage are distorted by the greed for power which guises itself as concern for order and communal good. For this reason, children play a central role in many of Lee's fiction: the hypocrisy dominating the adult world is rendered particularly odious when even a child's innocence becomes infected with it.

Works in Korean (Partial)
Novels
 Marriage is Madness (2000)
 Will You Come Play at Meokko's House (2001)
 Children Cannot Suppress Laughter (2003)
Short Stories
 Bad Woman, Good Man (2003)

References 

1967 births
Korean writers
Living people